UConn Health (formerly known as the UConn Health Center) is the branch of the University of Connecticut that oversees clinical care, advanced biomedical research, and academic education in medicine. The main branch is located in Farmington, Connecticut, in the US. It includes a teaching hospital (UConn John Dempsey Hospital), the UConn School of Medicine, School of Dental Medicine, and Graduate School. Other community care satellite locations exist in Avon, Canton, East Hartford, Putnam, Simsbury, Southington, Storrs, Torrington, West Hartford, and Willimantic, including two urgent cares in both Storrs and Canton.  The university owns and operates many smaller clinics around the state that contain UConn Medical Group, UConn Health Partners, University Dentists and research facilities. Andrew Agwunobi stepped down as the CEO of UConn Health in February 2022 after serving since 2014 for a private-sector job. Bruce Liang is UConn Heath's interim CEO and remains dean of the UConn School of Medicine. 

UConn Health has about 5,000 employees, and is closely linked with the University of Connecticut's main campus in Storrs through several cross-campus academic projects.  UConn Health is part of a plan introduced by Connecticut Governor Dannel P. Malloy, called "Bioscience Connecticut," and approved by the Connecticut General Assembly in 2011, to stimulate the economy in the state of Connecticut.

Health Care Services

UConn John Dempsey Hospital
UConn John Dempsey Hospital is a 234 licensed bed university hospital that provides comprehensive clinical and surgical services including for emergency care, heart attack, stroke, geriatics, maternal fetal medicine, cardiology, cancer care, orthopaedics, dermatology and neurosurgery.  The hospital is an acute care facility  and operates the only full service emergency department in the Farmington Valley. UConn Health has an estimated annual impact of $2.2 billion on the local economy.  The hospital was named after former Connecticut State Governor John N. Dempsey, after he successfully helped acquire funding for the academic hospital.

In the last year with available data, UConn Health had 8,653 admissions, 29,727 patients emergency room visits, and its surgeons performed 2,379 inpatient and 7,550 outpatient surgeries. UConn Health operates 68 medical residency training programs for physicians, as well as eight advanced dental training programs. 

Bioscience Connecticut construction began in 2013. It included a new patient care tower on the UConn Health campus, as well as renovations to the existing UConn John Dempsey Hospital. The project was completed in 2016. The building is certified in Leadership in Energy and Environmental Design (LEED).

Outpatient care
With more than 450 physicians in more than 50 specialties, the physicians of the UConn Health form one of the region's largest multi-specialty practice.  Outpatient services include primary care, OB/GYN, dermatology.  The UConn Center on Aging offers specialized services to aging populations.  Clinic sites are located on the Farmington campus, and at satellite offices in West Hartford, East Hartford, Avon, Simsbury and Southington.

Through Bioscience Connecticut, a new ambulatory care center began construction in 2012 on the UConn Health campus, part of a $840 million state initiative. The 300,000-square-foot outpatient ambulatory care center was supported with $203 million in private financing, and will house existing services and support the work of new faculty that will be joining the UConn Health.

Dental care
University Dentists, the group practice based on the Health Center's Farmington campus, provides preventive, corrective and restorative care for patients of all ages. In addition, the student and resident run dental services provide an affordable safety net for patients with little or no insurance.

UConn Health is home to a modern Center for Implant and Reconstructive Dentistry that offers dental implant therapies and is engaged in research into bone growth and augmentation.

Correctional Managed Health Care (CMHC)
UConn Heath's former Correctional Managed Health Care (CMHC) program, a prior longtime partnership with the Department of Correction, transitioned back to the DOC in 2018. The DOC now delivers comprehensive managed health care to State of Connecticut inmates. Medical, mental health, dental and ancillary services are provided by the DOC in all 14 facilities across the state.

Education 
UConn Health offers degree programs in medicine (MD), dentistry (DMD), and biomedical science (PhD); master's degree programs in public health and dental science.  UConn Health also sponsors residency and fellowship programs that provide specialty training for newly graduated physicians, and continuing education programs for practicing health care professionals. Combined degree programs, such as the MD/PhD, DMD/PhD, and MD/MPH are also offered.  Each year in Farmington, about 320 students work toward their medical doctor's degree (MD), 160 toward their doctor of medical dentistry degree (DMD), and over 300 towards their doctoral degree (PhD). The dental school is accredited by the American Dental Association. The MD program is accredited by the Liaison Committee on Medical Education.

As the dental and medical schools took shape during the 1960s, their planners took advantage of their simultaneous evolution to forge links between them. Most notably, medical and dental students share an essentially common curriculum during the first two years of their four-year degree programs. During this period they study the basic medical sciences together. This experience provides UConn's dental students with a foundation in the biomedical sciences that undergird the dental profession. UConn Health graduated its first students in 1972. The current dean of the UConn School of Medicine is Dr. Bruce T. Liang, M.D. The current dean of the UConn School of Dental Medicine is Dr. Steven Lepowsky, who was appointed in 2020. 

Through a variety of residency and fellowship programs, the School of Medicine provides postgraduate training for more than 550 newly graduated MD and DO physicians each year. Training occurs at UConn Health's main campus, as well as community hospitals, such as Hartford Hospital and St. Francis Hospital and The Hospital of Central Connecticut.

UConn Health houses and the Lyman Maynard Stowe Library administers the Hartford Medical Society Historical Library. This history of medicine collection includes 19th century American monographs, serials, pamphlets, manuscripts and artifacts.

Urban Service Track
Urban Service Track is a program that is based at University of Connecticut Health Center. It is designed to produce a cadre of well qualified health care professionals committed to serving Connecticut's urban underserved populations. As Urban Health Scholars, participants come from a select group of students enrolled in the University of Connecticut School of Dental Medicine, Pharmacy, Nursing, Medicine, Social Work, and Quinnipiac University's Physician Assistant Program. A total of 50 to 52 Urban Health Scholars, eight to ten students per school, are selected each year from among qualified applicants who have a demonstrated commitment to service. Urban Health Scholars gain valuable exposure to the complex and challenging issues of health care in the inner city.

In UST's 2007 pilot program, 24 students enrolled from the four health professions, attending three Learning Retreats and providing service at four community health centers. As of 2013, about 191 students have enrolled in the program.

This program has an 11 competency curriculum. These are: culture and linguistic appreciation; population health; health policy; advocacy; health care financing and management; leadership and interprofessional teamwork; utilization of community resources; and quality improvement and patient safety. It has a formal 2 year curriculum which is delivered through quarterly Learning Retreats hosted in communities that UST serves. These four hour retreats bring Urban Health Scholars from the five disciplines together for focused training sessions that examine the competencies through the lenses of vulnerable populations. These include: urban children and youth; the incarcerated and ex-offender; the homeless; individuals living with HIV/AIDS; the developmentally disabled; refugee and immigrant populations; the elderly and children; substance abusers; and veterans.

Research 
UConn Health publishes research in neuroscience, molecular biology, molecular pharmacology, biochemistry, cell physiology, toxicology, and endocrinology, among other fields.  The Alcohol Research Center at UConn Health is one of fourteen such federally supported centers in the nation; the Connecticut Clinical Chemosensory Research Center is one of five.

In 2010, the university established the Cell and Genome Sciences building, which includes its new Stem Cell Institute as well as cell biology and genetics research in its Center for Cell Analysis and Modeling and Department of Genetics and Developmental Biology.

See also

American Student Dental Association

References

Further reading

External links
Bioscience Connecticut
UConn Health Center
Lyman Maynard Stowe Library
Urban Service Track

Hospital buildings completed in 1966
Connecticut Health Center, University of
Farmington, Connecticut
Educational institutions established in 1966
Universities and colleges in Hartford County, Connecticut
University of Connecticut
1966 establishments in Connecticut
Teaching hospitals in Connecticut
Medical schools in Connecticut